Christopher Lippert (known as Chris Lippert; born March 31, 1963) is an American retired rugby union player who played at prop for the United States national rugby union team and the Barbarian F.C.

Early life and career 
Lippert was born in San Diego, California, U.S., on March 31, 1963. 
Lippert debuted for the United States national rugby union team on September 23, 1989.  
He made a total of 38 test appearances for the USA Eagles, including the 1991 Rugby World Cup, and captained the team in the 1996 Pan-American Championship.
Lippert played 3 matches for the Barbarian F.C. He was an All-American and won a National Championship with San Diego State University in 1987.  He also won five national titles from 1989 to 1996 while playing as a front-row stalwart for the Old Mission Beach Athletic Club.

Lippert was the first USA player to surpass 36 caps and his 38 caps was a national record when he retired in 1998.

Coaching career 
After retiring from professional rugby, Lippert served as the Manager for the United States national rugby sevens team and for the USA Eagles 15's, including the 2003 Rugby World Cup.

Awards 
Lippert was inducted into the U.S. Rugby Hall of Fame in 2020.

See also 

 United States national rugby union team

References 

American rugby union players
Rugby union props
Living people

1963 births
United States international rugby union players